Norman Chaffer OAM, FRZS, RAOU (1899 – 22 November 1992) was an Australian businessman, a bird photographer and an amateur ornithologist. He was a pioneer of colour cinematography and won many awards. He was a member of the Royal Australasian Ornithologists Union (RAOU), President 1954–1955, and made a Fellow of the RAOU in 1991. He authored In Quest of Bowerbirds (Rigby, 1984) which was illustrated with his photographs. He was a recipient of the Medal of the Order of Australia.

References

External links
Obituary (.pdf file)

1899 births
1992 deaths
Australian ornithologists
Australian photographers
Nature photographers
Australian cinematographers
Recipients of the Medal of the Order of Australia
20th-century Australian zoologists